Winslow is a village in Stephenson County, Illinois. The population was 338 at the 2010 census, down from 345 in 2000.

Government
Mayor of Winslow is Ronald Piña. The Treasurer is Jennifer Milliken and the Clerk is Holly Krupke.

Geography
Winslow is located at  (42.490470, -89.792060).

Demographics

As of the census of 2000, there were 345 people, 134 households, and 95 families residing in the village. The racial makeup of the village was 96.52% White, 1.16% Native American, 0.29% Asian, and 2.03% from two or more races. Hispanic or Latino of any race were 2.32% of the population.

There were 134 households, out of which 32.8% had children under the age of 18 living with them, 56.0% were married couples living together, 11.2% had a female householder with no husband present, and 28.4% were non-families. 24.6% of all households were made up of individuals, and 10.4% had someone living alone who was 65 years of age or older. The average household size was 2.57 and the average family size was 3.02.

In the village, the population was spread out, with 27.2% under the age of 18, 7.2% from 18 to 24, 26.1% from 25 to 44, 25.8% from 45 to 64, and 13.6% who were 65 years of age or older. The median age was 38 years. For every 100 females, there were 99.4 males. For every 100 females age 18 and over, there were 91.6 males.

The median income for a household in the village was $42,679, and the median income for a family was $46,250. Males had a median income of $28,214 versus $24,844 for females. The per capita income for the village was $15,595. About 5.5% of families and 5.5% of the population were below the poverty line, including 3.9% of those under age 18 and 11.9% of those age 65 or over.

Notable person

 William Frank Carver, expert marksman and owner of a Wild West exhibition in the early twentieth century; born in Winslow

References

External links
winslow-illinois.com
Stephenson County

Villages in Stephenson County, Illinois
Villages in Illinois